The Consumers' Association of Ireland Ltd. (CAI) was set up in 1966 to protect and educate consumers. Its first chair was Maude Rooney, who was also instrumental in the establishment of the Association.

See also
 Which?

References

External links 
 

Non-profit organisations based in the Republic of Ireland
Consumer organisations in Ireland